Rose leaf rosette-associated virus is a +ssRNA closterovirus which causes a unique, unusually dense and small rosette leaf habit on Rosa multiflora Thunb. branches.

DNA analyses of rose samples have not previously found closteroviruses, and thus they were previously thought to be unable to infect all Rosa, making RLRAV the first known.

References

External links 
 

Closteroviridae
Viral plant pathogens and diseases
Rose diseases